Klahanie is a Canadian nature television series which aired on CBC Television from 1967 to 1978.

Premise
The series concerned the wilderness, with topics including conservation. "Klahanie" is Chinook Jargon for "the great outdoors".

One episode featured documentary footage and discussion of the Supermarine Stranraer as flown on the Pacific coast.

Scheduling
This half-hour series was broadcast at various times from 2 March 1967 until 25 August 1978, most often on Saturday afternoons.

References

External links
 

CBC Television original programming
1967 Canadian television series debuts
1978 Canadian television series endings
1960s Canadian documentary television series
Nature educational television series
1970s Canadian documentary television series